The 2013–14 Southeastern Louisiana Lions basketball team represented Southeastern Louisiana University during the 2013–14 NCAA Division I men's basketball season. The Lions are led by ninth year head coach Jim Yarbrough and played their home games at the University Center and were members of the Southland Conference. They finished the season 12–18, 7–11 in Southland play to finish in tenth place. They lost in the first round of the Southland Conference tournament to Nicholls State.

Roster

Schedule
Source

|-
!colspan=9 style="background:#006643; color:#EAAB00;"| Regular season

|-
!colspan=9 style="background:#006643; color:#EAAB00;"| 2014 Southland tournament

See also
2013–14 Southeastern Louisiana Lady Lions basketball team

References

Southeastern Louisiana Lions basketball seasons
Southeastern Louisiana
2013 in sports in Louisiana
2014 in sports in Louisiana